Sofm can refer to:

 Self-organizing map, a type of artificial neural network (ANN)
 SofM, a Vietnamese League of Legends player